Illegal Business? 2000 is the third studio album by the American rapper Mac Mall, from Vallejo, California. It was released on March 23, 1999, via Young Black Brotha Records' sublabel, Don't Give Up Productions. The album peaked at number 185 on the Billboard 200 albums chart and at number 54 on the Top R&B/Hip-Hop Albums chart in the United States.

Track listing

Chart history

References

External links 

1999 albums
Mac Mall albums
Sequel albums